The following table indicates the party of elected officials in the United States insular area of American Samoa:
Governor
Lieutenant Governor

The table also indicates the historical party composition in the:
Territorial Senate
Territorial House of Representatives
Territory delegation to the U.S. House of Representatives

For a particular year, the noted partisan composition is that which either took office during that year or which maintained the office throughout the entire year. Only changes made outside regularly scheduled elections are noted as affecting the partisan composition during a particular year. Shading is determined by the final result of any mid-cycle changes in partisan affiliation.

See also
Politics of American Samoa
Elections in American Samoa

Politics of American Samoa
Government of American Samoa
American Samoa